The Balkan Basketball Championship, sometimes referred to as the Balkan Basketball Cup or the Balkan Basketball Games, is the defunct competition that was the men's basketball competition added in 1959 to the Balkan Games that started in 1929. The purpose of the "Balkan Games" was to strengthen the relations between the nations of the Balkans region. The Balkan Games were a collection of  athletics competitions added to the event over the years.

History
The first men's basketball competition took place in Bucharest, in 1959. At the time, basketball was considered to be an important activity by the countries that competed in it. The best players from the Balkans region often competed at the tournament. Interest in the championship waned, and it was eventually cancelled. The last basketball tournament was held at Skopje, in 1990.

Results

Sources
Athletic Echo Newspaper 14 September 1979 page 5

References

External links
Βαλκανικό 1979: Τον Γκάλη η Ελλάδα τον «υποδέχθηκε» με χρυσό μετάλλιο Balkan 1979: Gali was "welcomed" by Greece with a gold medal 
Εθνική μπάσκετ Σεπτέμβριος 1979 National Basketball September 1979 
H πλούσια… βαλκανική ιστορία Ελλάδας-Βουλγαρίας The rich Balkan history of Greece-Bulgaria 
MAKEDONIA newspaper pg4.

Basketball competitions in Europe between national teams
International basketball competitions hosted by Albania
International basketball competitions hosted by Bulgaria
International basketball competitions hosted by Greece
International basketball competitions hosted by Romania
International basketball competitions hosted by Turkey
International basketball competitions hosted by Yugoslavia
Sport in the Balkans
Sport in Europe

el:Βαλκανικοί αγώνες καλαθοσφαίρισης ανδρών